The anal triangle is the posterior part of the Perineum.  It contains the anal canal.

Structure
The anal triangle can be defined either by its vertices or its sides.
 Vertices
 one vertex at the coccyx bone
 the two ischial tuberosities of the pelvic bone
 Sides
 perineal membrane (posterior border of perineal membrane forms anterior border of anal triangle)
 the two sacrotuberous ligaments

Contents
Some components of the anal triangle include: 
 Ischioanal fossa
 Anococcygeal body
 Sacrotuberous ligament
 Sacrospinous ligament
 Pudendal nerve
 Internal pudendal artery and Internal pudendal vein
 Anal canal
 Muscles
 Sphincter ani externus muscle
 Gluteus maximus muscle
 Obturator internus muscle
 Levator ani muscle
 Coccygeus muscle

Additional images

See also
 Perineum
 Urogenital triangle

References

External links
  - "The Female Perineum: Boundaries of the Female Perineum"
 

Perineum
Human surface anatomy